The Yarmouth–Dennis Red Sox, or Y-D Red Sox, are a collegiate summer baseball team based in South Yarmouth, Massachusetts. The team is a member of the Cape Cod Baseball League (CCBL) and plays in the league's East Division. The Red Sox play their home games at Red Wilson Field on the campus of Dennis-Yarmouth Regional High School.

The Red Sox most recently won the CCBL championship in 2016 when they defeated the Falmouth Commodores two games to one to win the best of three championship series. The title was the team's third consecutive and sixth in a 13-year span. The Red Sox also won back-to-back league titles in 1989 and 1990. The team has been led since 1998 by Cypress College field manager Scott Pickler.

History

Pre-modern era

Early years

Baseball in the town of Yarmouth dates back to the early days of the sport on Cape Cod. The Yarmouth Mattakeesetts were organized in 1867 and battled the "Barnstable Cummaquids" on at least three occasions that year. After splitting their first two recorded contests, the seemingly evenly-matched teams met for a highly-anticipated third game, this time as an attraction at the Barnstable County Fair. The Cummaquids took the lopsided match, 30–13, and with their victory secured the prize of a "beautiful silver mounted carved black walnut bat costing $15."

In 1877, Yarmouth split a pair of games against the "Sandwich Resolutes". In a July 4 contest the following year, the Resolutes defeated Yarmouth, 14–2, but the teams played a much more closely contested game when they met once more in 1879. The Yarmouth team met up with a team from Barnstable again in 1883 for a July 4 contest that had become an annual event. The 1883 Yarmouth team featured pitcher Fred Tenney, principal of Yarmouth High School, who went on to play in the major leagues with the Washington Nationals and the Boston Reds of the Union Association.

In 1886, the Yarmouth Grays dropped a July 3 contest to the Brewster town club, 11–9, in a game that saw Brewster turn a rare triple play. The Grays fared better that season against teams from Barnstable and Harwich, defeating those clubs by decisive margins of 31–3 and 19–7.

In 1891 and 1892, Harvard University's Frank Hallowell was player/manager for the South Yarmouth team. Hallowell was a two-time gridiron All-American for Harvard, and also played center field for the Crimson nine. While at South Yarmouth, he was praised for his "fine work, and especially his system of coaching."

The early Cape League era (1923–1939)
In 1923, the Cape Cod Baseball League was formed and initially included four teams: Falmouth, Chatham, Osterville, and Hyannis. This early Cape League operated through the 1939 season and disbanded in 1940, due in large part to the difficulty of securing ongoing funding during the Great Depression. During this period, teams from various towns moved in and out of the league each season. The Yarmouth Athletic Association did not enter a team in the Cape League during this era, but played instead in the Cape Cod Twilight League.

The Upper and Lower Cape League era (1946–1962)

The Cape League reorganized in 1946 after a hiatus during World War II. The Yarmouth Indians and Dennis Clippers played in the Lower Cape Division. The Indians played at the John Simpkins school in South Yarmouth, while the Clippers' played home games at the Ezra Baker school in South Dennis. The neighboring towns developed a heated rivalry throughout the 1940s and 1950s.

The Clippers were the first in the Lower Cape league to play home games at night, as lights were installed at Baker Field in 1949, and the field also boasted an electronic scoreboard. The Lower Cape teams held their annual All-Star Game under the Baker lights in 1949, the Dennis diamond being considered one of the finest in the Cape League at the time. Skipper Bren Taylor's Clippers reached the CCBL title series in 1956, defeating Orleans in the semi-final playoffs, but losing out to Sagamore in the finals. The Clippers teams of the late 1950s and early 1960s featured hard-hitting infielder Jim Cross, an ice hockey star from Boston University, and CCBL Hall of Famer Bill Livesey of the University of Maine. The Clippers withdrew from the league and disbanded after the 1961 season.

CCBL Hall of Famer Cal Burlingame pitched for the Indians in the early 1950s, tossing no-hitters for Yarmouth in 1953 and 1954. The Indians of the late 1950s and early 1960s were skippered by John Halunen, and starred CCBL Hall of Famer Merrill "Red" Wilson, who joined the club in 1956. He became a seven-time all-star catcher for Yarmouth, and led the Indians to CCBL championships in 1958 and 1960, defeating the powerful Sagamore Clouters for both titles.

The 1958 Indians featured star hurlers Bob Sherman and Jack Silver, as well as CCBL Hall of Famer Jim Hubbard, an outfielder who went on to manage Cotuit to four consecutive Cape League titles in the 1960s. Yarmouth met perennial league powerhouse Orleans in the best-of-three 1958 Lower Cape title series. The teams split the first two games, with the Indians taking Game 1, 3–0, but dropping Game 2, 5–1. In Game 3, Yarmouth broke out the big bats against Orleans hurler and future major leaguer Art Quirk, the Lower Cape's Outstanding Pitcher of the season. The Indians piled up seven runs on Quirk, and Sherman made it stand up for a 7–5 series-clinching victory. The Indians moved on to face a powerful Sagamore team in the Cape League finals. In Game 1, the Indians shut down the Clouters' attack with a three-hit gem by Silver for a 2–1 victory. Sherman took the mound in Game 2, and the Indians came away with the 4–3 win to sweep the series and claim the team's first Cape League crown.

In 1960, Halunen's boys were at it again. After dispatching the Dennis Clippers in the first round of the playoffs, the Indians faced Harwich for the Lower Cape title. The Indians got a three-hit shutout performance by Ron Normand in Game 1 to win, 6–0. Game 2 was a pitcher's duel between Harwich's Dick Mayo and the Indians' Ned LeRoy. LeRoy no-hit Harwich through 6 2/3 innings, and finished strong in the 1–0 series-clinching win for Yarmouth. In the Cape League finals, Yarmouth again met up with Upper Cape champ Sagamore. Yarmouth took a rainy Game 1 by a score of 7–6. Games 2 and 3 were played as a doubleheader. The Indians dropped Game 2 at Sagamore, but came back to win the crown before a home crowd in Yarmouth.

In 1961, Red Wilson was named Lower Cape league MVP, and teammate Dick Cassani was the league's Outstanding Pitcher. The Indians were dominant in the regular season, and met up with Orleans for the Lower Cape finals. Cassani no-hit Orleans to win Game 1, 3–0, but Orleans answered by taking Game 2. Orleans looked to have the decisive Game 3 in hand, up 6–1 in the ninth, but the Indians staged a dramatic rally to take the game and the series. Yarmouth went on to face Cotuit in the Cape League championship series, but was downed two games to one.

Modern era (1963–present)

In 1963, the CCBL was reorganized and became officially sanctioned by the NCAA. The league would no longer be characterized by "town teams" who fielded mainly Cape Cod residents, but would now be a formal collegiate league. Teams began to recruit college players and coaches from an increasingly wide geographic radius.

The league was originally composed of ten teams, which were divided into Upper Cape and Lower Cape divisions. Yarmouth joined Harwich, Chatham, Orleans and a team from Otis Air Force Base in the Lower Cape Division.

The 1960s and 1970s

Yarmouth's 1965 team featured Colby College hurler Joe Jabar, who went 7–4 for the Indians on the season. He pitched nine complete games and fanned 74 batters in 14 starts, and was named the Lower Cape Division's starting pitcher at the 1965 CCBL All-Star Game. Jabar went on to pitch two more stellar seasons in the CCBL with Chatham, and was inducted into the CCBL Hall of Fame in 2003. His playing days with the Indians now behind him, Merrill "Red" Wilson became the club's skipper in 1966, and served in that role for 16 of the next 21 years.

In 1967, Yarmouth was managed by CCBL Hall of Famer Lou Lamoriello. A former all-star player in the league, Lamoriello had managed Sagamore to the league title in 1965. He recruited a rising high school senior from Connecticut to play for his 1967 Yarmouth team, and the 17-year-old Bobby Valentine proceeded to bat .294 against the Cape League's elite collegiate pitching that summer, while leading the league in runs scored. Valentine's performance impressed the Los Angeles Dodgers, who made him the 5th overall pick in the following year's MLB draft. Valentine's roommate at Yarmouth was CCBL Hall of Famer Dan DeMichele, himself a three-time CCBL all-star who had played on Lamoriello's championship 1965 Sagamore squad.
 

In 1968, manager Red Wilson returned to his position after a one-year hiatus, and the team became known as the Yarmouth Red Sox. Beginning in the early 1960s, the Yarmouth Chamber of Commerce had annually invited Boston Red Sox players, officials, and their families to take an all-expenses-paid getaway to Yarmouth during the MLB All-Star break, an event that had been billed as "Yarmouth Red Sox Day". The 1968 decision to change the team name "[recognized] the remarkable success of the annual visit to Yarmouth of the Boston team...which has established a special relationship between Yarmouth and the Red Sox," and capitalized on local excitement surrounding the Boston team's 1967 "Impossible Dream" season.

In 1973, the team's home games were moved from Simpkins Field to the Dennis-Yarmouth High School baseball diamond, and Yarmouth proceeded to make its first appearance in the league championship series in the modern era. The team featured future major leaguer Dave Schuler, who was the winning pitcher in the league All-Star Game that year. Despite posting a losing record in the regular season, skipper Red Wilson's Red Sox upset regular-season champion Chatham in the semi-final playoff series. Yarmouth went on to drop the championship series in five games to a Cotuit team that was in the midst of a string of four consecutive league titles.

In 1977, the team name was expanded to take in the town of Dennis. With the name change, the Red Sox continued to call D-Y High School home, although plans originally called for the team to play a limited number of home dates in Dennis at Ezra Baker School field. In a repeat of 1973, the now Yarmouth–Dennis Red Sox defeated Chatham in the playoff semi-finals but fell to Cotuit in the championship series. Y-D was led by future New York Yankees slugger Steve Balboni. Balboni hit 13 home runs for Y-D in 1977, and clobbered another two over Fenway Park's Green Monster in the annual CCBL All-Star Game. He was named league MVP and Outstanding Pro Prospect, and was inducted into the CCBL Hall of Fame in 2006.

The 1980s and 1990s bring back-to-back championships
Red Wilson continued to manage the Red Sox into the early 1980s. A beloved teacher, administrator, coach and athletic director at Dennis-Yarmouth High School, the baseball diamond shared by the school with the Y-D Red Sox was renamed in Wilson's honor in 1981. The 1981 Red Sox featured CCBL Hall of Famer Mark Angelo, who hit .335 and led the league with 14 home runs and 47 RBIs. The Red Sox' 1982 season was highlighted by an 18–3 July 4 win at Falmouth in which Y-D's Joe Olker went 6-for-6 and tied a league record with three home runs in the game. In 1984, an insect infestation at Red Wilson Field forced the "Road Sox" to play the entire season away from the home ballpark. Craig Biggio of the 1986 Y-D Red Sox went on to amass over 3,000 major league hits, and was inducted into the National Baseball Hall of Fame in Cooperstown, New York in 2015. 
 
Y-D returned to the league championship series in 1987, fueled by league MVP and CCBL Hall of Famer Mickey Morandini, who led the league in batting (.376) and established a new CCBL single-season record with 43 stolen bases. Despite losing the title series to Harwich, the 1987 season marked the beginning of a four-year stretch under CCBL Hall of Fame skipper Don Reed in which the Red Sox made the playoffs each season, winning three consecutive East Division regular season titles, and back-to-back league championships. The 1988 team featured future major leaguers Mike Mordecai, Denny Neagle, and CCBL Hall of Famer Eric Wedge, but was bounced from the playoffs in the semi-finals by Orleans.

In 1989, the Red Sox broke through with their first league title of the modern era. The team finished the regular season in first place atop the East Division, then faced Brewster in the playoff semi-finals. Y-D took Game 1 from the Whitecaps, 2–1, in 15 innings, and finished the series sweep with a 4–3 victory. In the league championship series, the Red Sox faced the Hyannis Mets. In Game 1 at Red Wilson Field, Red Sox hurler Jim Dougherty tossed a three-hit shutout and the Sox got homers from league MVP Kurt Olson and Holliston, Massachusetts native Mark Sweeney to stomp the Mets, 9–0. Game 2 was played in a steady rain at McKeon Field. Y-D got two triples from Sweeney and came away with a 6–1 triumph to sweep the series and claim the league crown. Sweeney, who hit .500 in 20 postseason at-bats, was named playoff MVP.

Sweeney, the star of the 1989 title club, returned to the Sox for the 1990 campaign. Y-D again finished the regular season atop the East Division, and swept Orleans in the semi-final playoff series. The Sox moved on to face a talented Wareham team in the title series. Y-D got 19 hits in Game 1 at home to outslug the Gatemen, 14–7. Sox catcher Kirk Piskor blasted three long balls in the game, including two in the eight-run third inning. Wareham held serve in Game 2, holding Y-D to just six hits en route to a 6–0 shutout at Clem Spillane Field. Game 3 went down to the wire, with Sweeney knocking a game-winning walk-off RBI in the ninth to give the Sox an 8–7 win and their second consecutive CCBL championship. Playoff MVP honors went to Piskor, and two-time title series hero Sweeney wrapped up a CCBL Hall of Fame career. After the series, it was announced that winning Red Sox skipper Don Reed was not asked to return the following season due to "philosophical differences." Reed went on to manage Wareham throughout the 1990s, where he won another pair of CCBL titles.

After its 1990 title, Y-D suffered a 10-season playoff drought, but the team nevertheless featured several notable players. The 1991 team was led by league MVP Brent Killen, and the 1993 team featured two top pitchers in the league's Outstanding Pro Prospect Chris Clemons and the league's Outstanding Pitcher Andy Taulbee. Jon Petke led the CCBL in batting in 1994 with a .379 mark, and sluggers Todd Greene and Eddy Furniss claimed the All-Star Game Home Run Hitting titles in 1992 and 1996 respectively. Red Sox hurlers tossed a pair of no-hitters in the decade, as Mark Watson stymied Harwich in 1994, and Hank Thoms did the same to Orleans in 1998. Y-D's 1997 team featured league batting champ Jason McConnell (.345), and home run champ Edmund Muth (7), the East Division MVP of the All-Star Game.

Three titles in four years mark the 2000s

Led by manager Scott Pickler, longtime Cypress College coach who had joined the Red Sox in 1998, Y-D finished in first place atop the East Division five times and took three CCBL championship crowns in a span of four years in the 2000s. Red Sox Slugger Jason Cooper was the league's home run derby champ in consecutive seasons in 2000 and 2001. University of Michigan righty Jim Brauer was an all-star for Y-D in 2001 with a 1.84 ERA, then returned in 2002 and tossed a nine-inning complete game no-hitter against Chatham. The Red Sox boasted the league's Outstanding Pro Prospect in 2002, as Wes Whisler, who set a league record with base hits in nine consecutive at bats, took the honors.

Pickler's first title came in 2004, when the team rolled through the playoffs, sweeping Brewster in the semi-finals, and sweeping Falmouth in the finals. The Red Sox took Game 1 of the title series at home, 4–3, on shortstop Ryan Rohlinger's game-winning 8th inning homer. Game 2 of the finals was an all-time classic, with the Sox coming back to tie the game at Guv Fuller Field in the ninth inning on an RBI by CCBL Outstanding New England Player Award winner Frank Curreri. With two outs and the bases loaded in the bottom of the tenth, Y-D outfielder Jim Rapaport made a game-saving diving catch on a sinking liner to right. In the top of the 11th, Y-D opened it up with four runs, including a two-run bomb by Nick Moresi, to secure the 8–4 victory and claim the league crown. Y-D was led by playoff co-MVPs Rohlinger and pitcher Joshua Faiola. Rohlinger hit .429 in the postseason, including a key squeeze bunt in the 11th inning of the Game 2 finale. Faiola earned the save in Game 1 of the finals, then got the win in Game 2, pitching two innings of scoreless relief.

Pickler's 2006 team featured future San Francisco Giants all-star catcher Buster Posey, who was a CCBL all-star at shortstop. The team was particularly strong on the mound, boasting the league's Outstanding Pitcher Terry Doyle and the Outstanding Relief Pitcher Josh Fields. Doyle, a Warwick, Rhode Island native and Boston College product, struck out 52 on the season, including 12 in his July 16 no-hit performance against Chatham. Y-D lost Game 1 of its semi-final playoff series at home against Brewster, but went on the road to claim Game 2 and won the series at home in Game 3. The same sequence repeated in the finals, as Y-D dropped Game 1 at home to Wareham, only to tie the series with a road victory in Game 2, and claim the championship at home in front of a crowd of over 8,000 at Red Wilson Field. In the decisive game, Y-D starter Doyle was perfect through four, going six innings with nine strikeouts and one walk and allowing only one run in the Red Sox' 5–1 victory. Playoff MVP honors went to Red Sox reliever David Robertson, who pitched a perfect three innings with seven strikeouts to close out the Gatemen in the finale.

Posey returned for the 2007 campaign, and was surrounded by perhaps an even more talented squad. Future major leaguer Gordon Beckham took over at shortstop, while Posey shared time at catcher with future major leaguer Jason Castro. Beckham and Castro were named All-Star Game starters for the East Division in 2007, with Posey making the all-star team as a reserve. Beckham led the league in dingers with nine, and was tied for tops in RBI with 35. The team also featured the league's Outstanding Relief Pitcher, Nick Cassavechia, who led the league with 11 saves while recording a 1.07 ERA with 24 strikeouts and only three walks in 25.1 innings of work. The team cruised to the playoffs with a dominating 31–12–1 regular season record. As in 2004, the Red Sox swept the final series against Falmouth, again winning the final game in Falmouth in dramatic fashion by scoring the go-ahead run on a Nick Romero suicide squeeze in the eighth inning scoring Posey. Castro scored another on a passed ball and Y-D's 2–0 lead held up as Y-D took the crown. Playoff MVP honors went to Game 2 starter Trevor Holder who held the Commodores to one hit in eight innings while striking out ten. Holder gave way to Cassavechia who struck out the side in the ninth to claim the title for Y-D. The Red Sox had won their third title in four years, and the 2007 trio of Posey, Beckham and Castro went on to be selected as three of the top ten picks in the 2008 MLB draft.

Pickler's 2009 team again featured the league's top pitchers. The tall southpaw and future Boston Red Sox ace Chris Sale won the CCBL Outstanding Pitcher Award, fanning a league-high 57 batters while walking only nine in 55 innings of work with a 1.47 ERA. CCBL Outstanding Relief Pitcher Tyler Burgoon led the league with 12 saves, striking out 34 in 21.1 innings with a 1.69 ERA.

The 2010s and a Y-D "three-peat"

After winning three titles in four years with the Red Sox in the 2000s, manager Scott Pickler bested that feat in the 2010s, skippering Y-D to three consecutive league championships from 2014 to 2016, qualifying for postseason play in every year of the decade, and reaching the finals series five times.

Stanford University hurler Jordan Pries provided one of the highlights of the 2010 season when he tossed a no-hitter against Orleans. Y-D boasted the East Division All-Star Game MVP in three consecutive seasons with Caleb Ramsey in 2010, James Ramsey (no relation) in 2011, and Alex Blandino in 2012. The Red Sox also owned the league batting crown in 2011 with Stephen Piscotty's .349 mark. The team reached the league championship series in 2010 and again in 2012, but were shut down by Cotuit and Wareham respectively.

The 2014 Red Sox featured future major leaguers Andrew Stevenson and Walker Buehler, and the league's Outstanding Pro Prospect and Outstanding Relief Pitcher, Phil Bickford. The team began the season winning only five of its first 16 games, but came on strong in the second half. In the opening round of the playoffs, Y-D dropped Game 1 to Orleans, but with Buehler on the mound in Game 2, the Red Sox answered back with a 9–0 pasting of the Firebirds to even the series. Y-D pushed across a run on a second inning sacrifice bunt in Game 3, and Kevin Duchene twirled a masterful one-hit gem, allowing only one hit in 7 1/3 innings. The single run stood up as Bickford came in to slam the door and give the Sox a 1–0 victory to claim the series. In the East Division finals against Harwich, center fielder Stevenson provided the power in Game 1, clouting a homer and four RBIs in the Sox' 7–2 road win. The Mariners took Game 2, but Y-D prevailed in the Game 3 pitchers' duel, 2–0, on a combined shutout by Justin Jacome and Bickford, who struck out six in 2 2/3 innings for the save. In the championship series, Y-D faced Falmouth, and sent Buehler to the mound in Game 1. Buehler tossed eight shutout innings, and late-season call-up catcher Marcus Mastrobuoni went 3-for-4 with a homer, three RBIs, and two runs scored as the Sox took the opener, 5–0. Game 2 at Red Wilson Field was back-and-forth early, but the Sox took the lead with a six-run sixth, and handed the game over to Bickford, who tossed the final three innings of shutout ball for the save to close out the title sweep with a 10–4 win. Playoff MVP honors were shared by ace Buehler and the hot-hitting Mastrobuoni, who batted .444 in the playoffs and went 5-for-6 while driving in five of the team's 15 runs in the championship series.

Y-D narrowly squeaked into the playoffs in 2015, not clinching a spot until the final day of the regular season. The club was led by all-stars up the middle with double-play tandem Tommy Edman and Donnie Walton and center fielder Cole Billingsley, and also featured switch-hitting slugger Gio Brusa, and mound ace Ricky Thomas. The Sox swept Brewster in the opening round of playoffs, with Thomas twirling six scoreless innings in the Game 2 clincher. In the East Division finals against Orleans, Y-D dropped Game 1 on the road, but came back to win a dramatic Game 2 at Red Wilson Field. Tied at 1–1 after seven, the Red Sox brought in Ben Bowden for five innings of scoreless relief. With the bases loaded in the bottom of the 13th, Brusa stole home on a wild pitch to give the Sox the 2–1 victory to even the series. Brusa led off the scoring early in Game 3, launching a bomb over the Eldredge Park center field fence, and starter Dustin Hunt struck out 10 and allowed only two Firebird hits in 7 2/3 shutout innings. Walton drove in Brusa for another run in the eighth, and the Red Sox held on for a 2–1 win that propelled them to the title series for the second consecutive season. In the championship round, Y-D faced Hyannis, who crushed the Sox, 8–1, in Game 1 at McKeon Park. Y-D bounced back with a 9–3 victory at home in Game 2 behind the stellar mound work of Thomas, a three-run bomb by Walton, and a two-run shot by Edman. In Game 3, the Sox returned to Hyannis and avenged their 8–1 Game 1 defeat, this time coming out on top of an 8–1 tally. Billingsley's three-run eighth-inning homer sealed the deal, Bowden tossed the final two innings of relief, and Y-D took home its second consecutive league title. Playoff MVP honors for Y-D were shared by Walton and Bowden.

The Red Sox completed the "three-peat" in 2016, led by a sterling playoff performance by University of Maryland infielder Kevin Smith. The club met Orleans in the opening round of the playoffs, and took Game 1 with a 4–2 win marked by a mammoth blast by Smith. The Sox completed the sweep in Game 2 at Eldredge Park, taking a tight 2–1 ballgame on the strength of a second-inning dinger by Cape Cod native Will Toffey, and an eighth-inning RBI by Joey Thomas. The win set up an East Division finals match with Chatham. Smith homered again in Game 1 at Red Wilson Field, and Y-D took the slugfest, 9–8. The Sox completed their second series sweep in Game 2 on the road, getting six effective innings by starter William Montgomery, and prevailing by a 4–1 tally, sending the Sox to a title series match against Falmouth. The Sox fell to Falmouth, 5–4, in the Game 1 opener at Guv Fuller Field. In Game 2 at home, Y-D jumped out to a 3–0 lead in the first on back-to-back homers by Toffey and Deon Stafford, Jr., and got a two-run clout in the fourth by Smith, knotting the series with a 9–4 win. The Sox went up on the Commodores early in Game 3, scoring three runs in the first two innings to take a 3–0 lead. Starter Bryan Sammons tossed six-plus shutout innings of two-hit baseball, and closer Calvin Faucher extinguished a rally in the eighth and slammed the door in the ninth to make the score hold up as the final tally, the win earning the Red Sox their third consecutive league title. Smith was awarded playoff MVP honors, having batted .370 with three homers in the playoffs. His sixth league championship, the 2016 title tied Scott Pickler with Falmouth's Bill Livesey and Orleans' Laurin "Pete" Peterson for CCBL career championships by a manager. Pickler was inducted into the CCBL Hall of Fame in 2019.

Y-D again boasted the league's top pitchers in 2017 with CCBL Outstanding Pitcher Kris Bubic and Outstanding Relief Pitcher Riley McCauley. Former team president, general manager, and longtime volunteer Barbara Ellsworth was inducted into the CCBL Hall of Fame in 2018. The 2019 Red Sox were led by the league's Outstanding Pro Prospect Austin Wells, who batted .308 with seven homers.

The 2020s
The 2020 CCBL season was cancelled due to the coronavirus pandemic. In 2022, Y-D skipper Scott Pickler recorded his 540th career CCBL victory, passing longtime Chatham coach John Schiffner atop the league's all-time managerial wins list.

CCBL Hall of Fame inductees

The CCBL Hall of Fame and Museum is a history museum and hall of fame honoring past players, coaches, and others who have made outstanding contributions to the CCBL. Below are the inductees who spent all or part of their time in the Cape League with Yarmouth-Dennis.

Notable alumni

 Dan Altavilla 2013
 Chris Anderson 2012
 Mark Appel 2011
 Carlos Asuaje 2012
 Brandon Bailey 2015
 Patrick Bailey 2018
 John Baker 2000–2001
 Steve Balboni 1977
 Jett Bandy 2010
 Ricky Barrett 2000
 Mike Baumann 2016
 Gordon Beckham 2007
 Mike Belfiore 2008
 Alan Benes 1991
 Phil Bickford 2014
 Shane Bieber 2015
 Craig Biggio 1986
 Aaron Blair 2012
 Alex Blandino 2012–2013
 Mike Bordick 1986
 Michael Bourn 2002
 Ben Bowden 2015
 Tony Brizzolara 1975
 Kris Bubic 2017
 Walker Buehler 2014
 Dan Butler 2009
 Josh Butler 2004
 Matt Carasiti 2011
 Jesse Carlson 2001
 Chris Carter 2002–2003
 Jason Castro 2007
 Chris Clemons 1993
 Steve Connelly 1994
 Sam Coonrod 2013
 Carlos Cortes 2017
 Collin Cowgill 2007
 Gabe Cramer 2015
 Evan Crawford 2006
 Jim Cross 1956–1958
 Trevor Crowe 2003
 Carl Dale 1993
 Joey DeNato 2011–2012
 Anthony DeSclafani 2010
 Jim Dougherty 1988–1989
 Scott Downs 1996
 Terry Doyle 2006–2007
 Jeff Duncan 1999
 Mike Durant 1989–1990
 Tommy Edman 2015
 Brad Emaus 2006
 Morgan Ensberg 1997
 Calvin Faucher 2016
 Erick Fedde 2013
 Josh Fields 2006
 Eric Filia 2013
 Randy Fontanez 2010
 Chad Fonville 1991
 Jake Fox 2002
 Eddy Furniss 1996
 Chi Chi Gonzalez 2012
 Paul Gonzalez 1989
 Peyton Graham 2021
 Grant Green 2007
 Todd Greene 1992
 Matt Guerrier 1997
 Taylor Gushue 2013
 Joe Hall 1987
 Frank Hallowell 1891–1892
 David Hamilton 2018
 Mitch Hannahs 1988
 Brett Harker 2004
 Will Harris 2004
 Steve Hathaway 2011
 Shawn Haviland 2007
 Brad Hawpe 1999
 Drew Hayes 2009
 Tommy Henry 2017–2018
 Wes Hodges 2004
 Nico Hoerner 2017
 Mario Hollands 2009
 John Hudgins 2002
 Luke Hudson 1996
 Philip Humber 2003
 Nick Hundley 2003
 Kyle Isbel 2017
 Joseph Jabar 1965
 Link Jarrett 1993
 Tyler Jay 2014
 Brian Johnson 2011
 Joe Johnson 1981
 Rob Johnson 2003
 Jonathan Jones 2009
 Mitch Jones 1999
 James Kaprielian 2013
 Alex Katz 2013
 Dominic Keegan 2021
 Joe Kelly 2008
 Bobby Korecky 2002
 Jake Lamb 2011
 Matt LaPorta 2004
 Mike LaValliere 1981
 Brooks Lee 2021
 Justin Lehr 1997
 Josh Lester 2014
 Ben Lively 2012
 Bill Livesey 1959–1960
 Tommy Mace 2018
 Tony Mansolino 2003
 Michael Matuella 2013
 John Mayberry, Jr. 2003
 Kirk McCaskill 1980
 Daniel McCutchen 2004–2005
 Cody McKay 1994
 Jon Meloan 2003
 Whit Merrifield 2008
 Jared Mitchell 2008
 Garrett Mock 2002–2003
 Shane Monahan 1993
 Mickey Morandini 1987
 Mike Mordecai 1988
 Brandon Morrow 2004–2005
 Danny Muno 2010
 Jeff Musselman 1984
 Denny Neagle 1988
 Ryne Nelson 2018
 David Newhan 1993–1994
 Russ Ortiz 1994
 Larry Owens 1988
 Jordan Pacheco 2006
 Joe Panik 2010
 Michael Papierski 2015
 Steve Parris 1988
 Greg Peavey 2008–2009
 Chris Petersen 1991
 Marc Pisciotta 1990
 Stephen Piscotty 2011
 Buster Posey 2006–2007
 Cody Poteet 2014
 Ritchie Price 2005
 J. J. Putz 1997
 Mike Raczka 1982–1983
 James Ramsey 2011
 Anthony Ranaudo 2008
 Fred Rath Jr. 1992
 Britt Reames 1994
 Mark Reynolds 2002
 Matt Reynolds 2011
 Alfonso Rivas 2017
 Bert Roberge 1975
 David Robertson 2006
 Ryan Rohlinger 2004
 Scott Ruffcorn 1989
 Josh Rutledge 2008–2009
 Chris Sale 2009
 Tony Sanchez 2008
 Dave Schuler 1972–1973
 J. J. Schwarz 2016
 Connor Seabold 2016
 Steve Selsky 2009
 Justin Shafer 2012–2013
 Mike Shawaryn 2015
 Glenn Sherlock 1981–1982
 A. J. Simcox 2014
 Seth Simmons 2009
 Jordan Smith 2011
 Kevin Smith 2016
 Steve Smyth 1998
 Collin Snider 2016
 Scott Snodgress 2010
 Tom Songin 1974
 Josh Staumont 2014
 Andrew Stevenson 2014
 D. J. Stewart 2013
 Michael Stutes 2005
 Cory Sullivan 2000
 Mark Sweeney 1989–1990
 Beau Taylor 2010
 Chris Taylor 2011
 Michael Taylor 2006
 Fred Tenney 1883
 Curtis Thigpen 2003
 Larry Thomas 1990
 Stan Thomas 1968–1970
 Drew Thorpe 2021
 Andrew Thurman 2011–2012
 Will Toffey 2015–2016
 Shawn Tolleson 2008
 Sam Travis 2012
 Jose Trevino 2013
 Chris Turner 1989–1990
 Justin Turner 2005
 Erich Uelmen 2016
 Bobby Valentine 1967
 Jamie Vermilyea 2002 
 Donnie Walton 2014–2015
 Mark Watson 1994
 Gary Wayne 1983
 Justin Wayne 1998
 Eric Wedge 1988
 Zack Weiss 2011
 Austin Wells 2019
 Chris Welsh 1976
 Matt Whatley 2016
 Wes Whisler 2002–2003
 Andy Wilkins 2008
 Jackson Williams 2005
 Darrin Winston 1987
 Matt Wise 1995
 Connor Wong 2015
 Blake Wood 2005
 Dan Wright 1998
 Jason Young 1998
 Pete Young 1987
 Daniel Zamora 2015
 Mike Zunino 2011

Yearly results

Results by season, 1946–1962

* Regular seasons split into first and second halves are designated as (A) and (B).

Results by season, 1963–present

League award winners

(*) - Indicates co-recipient

All-Star Game selections

Italics - Indicates All-Star Game Home Run Hitting Contest participant (1988 to present)

No-hit games

Managerial history

(*) - Season count excludes 2020 CCBL season cancelled due to coronavirus pandemic.

Fan culture
Red Wilson Field is the official home of the Sinker Burger, the Hurler Burger, and the Boston Screamer. Introduced during the 2004 season, the Sinker is a hamburger served on a lightly toasted cake doughnut, with three varieties: inside, down-the-middle, and outside (cinnamon, powder, and plain). The Hurler, also introduced in 2004, is a hamburger patty served between the halves of a jelly doughnut, finished with a squirt of canned cheese. The Boston Screamer, which made its official debut in 2010, is a hamburger served on a Boston cream doughnut. On July 19, 2011, the Yarmouth–Dennis Red Sox served their 6000th "upgraded" hamburger.

In popular culture
 In the 2001 movie Summer Catch, scenes where the Chatham A's play on the road at Y-D were filmed at Red Wilson Field.
 The Red Sox hosted the 2006 CCBL All-Star Game, which was broadcast on National Public Radio on Cape Cod.  The game was broadcast by the team's play-by-play announcer, Dan Rubin, and the League's Director of Public Relations, John Garner.
 The Red Sox hosted the CCBL All-Star Game in 2013, which was aired live across the country on Fox College Sports.

See also
 Yarmouth–Dennis Red Sox players

References

External links

Rosters

 2000
 2001
 2002
 2003
 2004
 2005
 2006
 2007
 2008
 2009
 2010
 2011
 2012
 2013
 2014
 2015
 2016
 2017
 2018
 2019
 2021
 2022

Other links
Yarmouth-Dennis Red Sox official site
CCBL Home Page

Cape Cod Baseball League teams
Amateur baseball teams in Massachusetts
Yarmouth, Massachusetts
Dennis, Massachusetts